The 2019–20 Utah State Aggies men's basketball team represented Utah State University in the 2019–20 NCAA Division I men's basketball season. The Aggies, led by second-year head coach Craig Smith, played their home games at the Smith Spectrum in Logan, Utah as members of the Mountain West Conference. They finished the season 26–8, 12–6 in Mountain West play to finish in a three-way tie for second place. They defeated New Mexico, Wyoming and San Diego State to become champions of the Mountain West tournament, their second consecutive Mountain West tournament championship. They earned the Mountain West's automatic bid to the NCAA tournament. However, on March 12 it was announced that the NCAA Tournament would be cancelled due to the COVID-19 pandemic.

Previous season
The Aggies shared the regular-season Mountain West title with Nevada, and defeated New Mexico, Fresno State, and San Diego State to win the Mountain West tournament to earn the Mountain West's automatic bid to the NCAA tournament for their first appearance since 2011. They lost in the first round of the NCAA Tournament to Washington.

Offseason

Departures

Incoming college transfers

Recruiting

Preseason

Mountain West media poll
The Mountain West Conference media poll was released on October 15, 2019. The Aggies were unanimously selected by MW media members as the preseason favorites.

Preseason All-MWC teams
Sam Merrill and Neemias Queta were selected to the All-MWC Preseason Team. Merrill was additionally selected as the Mountain West Preseason Player of the Year.

Roster

Schedule and results

|-
!colspan=9 style=| Exhibition

|-
!colspan=9 style=| Regular season

|-
!colspan=9 style=| Mountain West tournament

Rankings

*AP does not release post-NCAA Tournament rankings

References 

Utah State Aggies
Utah State Aggies men's basketball seasons
Aggies
Aggies